Paranthias colonus (the Pacific creolefish) is a species of grouper found in the Eastern Pacific Ocean. They are typically found in small aggregations well above reefs, but will retreat to the reef at the approach of danger. They form large midwater schools while feeding on plankton. They occur up the a depth of 100 m.  They feed mainly on small planktonic animals that are picked individually from the water, made possible by their shortened snout which facilitates close-range binocular vision.

Description
From: The body of the Pacific creolefish is elongate, fusiform.  The head is small, both profiles are convex. There are 37–44 rakers on the first gill arch.  Dorsal rays IX, 19–21; anal rays III, 9-11; pectoral rays 19–23.  The tail fin is strongly concave. Pacific creolefish grow to ~36 cm.

Pacific creolefish young are often bright yellow with five small dark spots on back.  The adults are greenish brown dorsally and reddish below, with five white or blue-white spots on the back.  The fins are reddish.

Distribution
Eastern Pacific: Gulf of California to Peru, including the Revillagigedo, Galapagos, Clipperton, Cocos Island, and Malpelo islands.

Parasites 

As all fish species, the Pacific creolefish harbours a number of parasites, including, off Mexico, the digeneans Prodistomum orientalis, Brachyphallus sp., Lecithochirium sp., the nematodes Anisakis sp. and Spinitectus sp., the copepods Caligus sp., and the isopods Hatschekia sp. The diplectanid monogenean Pseudorhabdosynochus jeanloui was described in 2015 from this fish off Peru.

References

External links
 
 
 

Serranidae
Fish described in 1846